This is a list of high schools in the state of North Carolina.

Any school that is not under a title "Charter schools" or "Private schools" is a public school.

Alamance County

 Eastern Alamance High School, Mebane
 Western Alamance High School, Elon

Burlington

 Blessed Sacrament School (Private)
 Burlington Christian Academy (Private)
 The Burlington School (Private)
 Clover Garden School (Charter)
 Hugh M. Cummings High School
 Walter M. Williams High School

Graham

 Alamance Christian School (Private)
 Alamance-Burlington Early College
 Graham High School
 The Hawbridge School (Charter)
 Ray Street Academy
 River Mill Academy (Charter)
 Southern Alamance High School

Alexander County
 Alexander Central High School, Taylorsville

Alleghany County
 Alleghany High School, Sparta

Anson County
 Anson County Early College, Polkton

Wadesboro

 Anson Academy
 Anson County Career Connect Program
 Anson High School
 Anson New Technology High School

Ashe County

West Jefferson

 Ashe County Early College
 Ashe County High School

Avery County

 Avery County High School, Newland
 Majorie Williams Academy, Crossnore (Charter)

Beaufort County

 Northside High School, Pinetown
 Pungo Christian Academy, Belhaven (Private)
 Southside High School, Chocowinity
 Terra Ceia Christian School, Pantego (Private)

Washington

 Beaufort County Early College High School
 Beaufort County Educational Technical Center
 Washington High School

Bertie County
 Lawrence Academy, Merry Hill (Private)

Windsor

 Bertie Early College High School
 Bertie High School
 Bertie STEM High School

Bladen County

 East Bladen High School, Elizabethtown
 West Bladen High School, Bladenboro

Brunswick County

 North Brunswick High School, Leland
 South Brunswick High School, Southport
 West Brunswick High School, Shallotte

Bolivia

 Brunswick County Early College High School
 Center of Applied Science and Technology (COAST)

Buncombe County

 Charles D. Owen High School, Black Mountain
 Christ School, Arden (Private)
 Enka High School, Enka
 Mount Pisgah Academy, Candler (Private)
 North Buncombe High School, Weaverville

Asheville

 A. C. Reynolds High School
 Asheville High School
 Asheville School (Private)
Buncombe County Early College
 Carolina Day School (Private)
 Clyde A. Erwin High School
Martin L. Nesbitt Discovery Academy
 Odyssey School
 T. C. Roberson High School

Swannanoa

 Asheville Christian Academy (Private)
 Community High School

Burke County

 East Burke High School, Connelly Springs
 Draughn High School, Valdese
 Hallyburton Academy, Drexel

Morganton

 Burke Middle College
 Freedom High School
 North Carolina School for the Deaf
 R. L. Patton High School
 STEAM Academy

Cabarrus County

 Hickory Ridge High School, Harrisburg
 Mount Pleasant High School, Mount Pleasant

Concord

 Cannon School (Private)
 Carolina International School (Charter)
 Central Cabarrus High School
 Concord First Assembly Academy (Private)
 Concord Academy (Private)
 Concord High School
 Cox Mill High School
 Jay M. Robinson High School
 West Cabarrus High School

Kannapolis

 A. L. Brown High School
 Northwest Cabarrus High School

Caldwell County
 Gateway School, Granite Falls

Hudson

 Caldwell Career Center Middle College
 Caldwell Early College High School
 Heritage Christian School (Private)
 South Caldwell High School

Lenoir

 Hibriten High School
 West Caldwell High School

Camden County
 Camden County High School, Camden

Carteret County

 Croatan High School, Newport
 East Carteret High School, Beaufort
 West Carteret High School, Morehead City

Caswell County
 Bartlett Yancey High School, Yanceyville

Catawba County

 Bunker Hill High School, Claremont
 Maiden High School, Maiden

Catawba

 Bandys High School
 Catawba Rosenwald Education Center

Hickory

 Challenger Early College High School
 Hickory Career & Arts Magnet School
 Hickory Christian Academy (Private)
 Hickory High School
 St. Stephens High School
 University Christian High School (Private)

Newton

 Fred T. Foard High School
 Discovery High School of Newton-Conover
 Newton-Conover High School

Chatham County

 Chatham Central High School, Bear Creek
 Woods Charter School, Chapel Hill

Pittsboro

 Northwood High School
 Seaforth Highschool

Siler City

 Chatham Charter High School (Charter)
 Chatham School of Science and Engineering Early College
 Jordan-Matthews High School
 SAGE Academy

Cherokee County
 Andrews High School, Andrews

Murphy

 Hiwassee Dam High School
 Murphy Adventist Christian School (Private)
 Murphy High School

Chowan County
 John A. Holmes High School, Edenton

Clay County
 Hayesville High School, Hayesville

Cleveland County

 Burns High School, Lawndale
 Crest High School, Boiling Springs
 Kings Mountain High School, Kings Mountain

Shelby

 Cleveland Early College High School
 North Shelby Alternative School
 Shelby High School

Columbus County

 East Columbus High School, Lake Waccamaw
 South Columbus High School, Tabor City
 West Columbus High School, Cerro Gordo

Whiteville

 Southeastern Early College and Career Academy
 Whiteville High School

Craven County
 West Craven High School, Vanceboro

Havelock

 Early College EAST
 Havelock High School

New Bern

 Craven Early College High School
 The Epiphany School of Global Studies
 New Bern High School

Cumberland County
 Cape Fear High School, Vander

Fayetteville

Public

 A.B. Wilkins High School
 Cross Creek Early College High School
 Cumberland International Early College High School
 Cumberland Polytechnic High School
 Douglas Byrd High School
 E. E. Smith High School
 Jack Britt High School
 Massey Hill Classical High School
 Pine Forest High School
 Ramsey Street High School
 Reid Ross Classical Middle/High School
 Seventy-First High School
 Terry Sanford High School
 Westover High School

Private

 Berean Baptist Academy
 Cumberland Country Christian School
 Fayetteville Academy
 Fayetteville Christian School
 Freedom Christian Academy
 Northwood Temple Academy
 Trinity Christian School
 Village Christian Academy

Hope Mills

 Gray's Creek High School
 South View High School

Currituck County

 Currituck County High School, Barco
 J.P. Knapp Early College High School, Currituck

Dare County

 Cape Hatteras Secondary School, Buxton
 First Flight High School, Kill Devil Hills
 Manteo High School, Manteo

Davidson County

 Ledford Senior High School, Wallburg
 Oak Grove High School, Midway
 South Davidson High School, Denton
 West Davidson High School,  Tyro

Lexington

 Central Davidson High School
 Davidson Early College High School
 Davidson County High School
 Lexington Senior High School
 North Davidson High School
 Sheets Memorial Christian School
 Union Grove Christian School
 Yadkin Valley Regional Career Academy

Thomasville

 East Davidson High School
 Thomasville High School

Davie County

Mocksville

 Central Davie Academy
 Davie County Early College High School
 Davie County High School

Duplin County

 Duplin Early College High School, Kenansville
 East Duplin High School, Beulaville
 James Kenan High School, Warsaw
 North Duplin Junior Senior High School, Calypso
 Wallace-Rose Hill High School, Teachey

Durham County

Durham

Public

 Charles E. Jordan High School
 City of Medicine Academy
 Durham School of the Arts
 Hillside High School
 Hillside New Tech High School
 Josephine Dobbs Clement Early College
 Lakeview Alternative School
 Middle College High School at DTCC
 Northern High School
 Riverside High School
 School for Creative Studies
 Southern School of Energy and Sustainability
 North Carolina School of Science and Mathematics

Private/Charter

 Carolina Friends School (Private)
 Cresset Christian Academy (Private)
 Durham Academy (Private)
 Mount Zion Christian Academy (Private)
 Research Triangle High School (Charter)
 Trinity School of Durham and Chapel Hill (Private)
 Voyager Academy (Charter)

Edgecombe County

 North Edgecombe High School, Leggett
 Southwest Edgecombe High School, Pinetops

Tarboro

 Edgecombe Early College High School
 Tarboro High School

Forsyth County

 Forsyth Country Day School, Lewisville (Private)
 Ronald W. Reagan High School, Pfafftown
 Walkertown High School, Walkertown 
 West Forsyth High School, Clemmons

Kernersville

 Bishop McGuinness Catholic High School (Private)
 East Forsyth High School
 Glenn High School
 Triad Baptist Christian Academy

Winston-Salem
 University of North Carolina School of the Arts (university with a high school program)

Public

 Atkins Academic/Technology High School
 Career Center
 Carter Alternative High School
 Carver High School
 Early College of Forsyth
 Forsyth Middle College
 Kingswood Alternative School
 Main Street Academy
 Mount Tabor High School
 North Forsyth High School
 Parkland Magnet High School
 Paisley Magnet School
 Richard J. Reynolds High School
 Winston-Salem Preparatory Academy

Private Schools

 Calvary Baptist Day School
 Carter G. Woodson School (Charter)
 Gospel Light Christian School
 Salem Academy
 Salem Baptist Christian School
 Winston Salem Christian School
 Woodland Baptist Christian School

Franklin County

 Bunn High School, Bunn
 Franklinton High School, Franklinton

Louisburg

 Franklin County Early College High School
 Louisburg High School

Gaston County

 Bessemer City High School, Bessemer City
 Cherryville High School, Cherryville
 South Point High School, Belmont
 Stuart W. Cramer High School, Cramerton 
 Warlick Academy, Ranlo

Dallas

 Gaston Early College High School
 North Gaston High School

Gastonia

 Ashbrook High School
 Forestview High School
 Gaston Christian School (Private)
 Gaston Day School (Private)
 Highland School of Technology
 Hunter Huss High School
 Piedmont Community Charter School (Charter)
 Webb Street School

Mount Holly

 East Gaston High School
 Mountain Island Charter School (Charter)

Gates County
 Gates County Senior High School, Gatesville

Graham County
 Robbinsville High School, Robbinsville

Granville County
 Granville Central High School, Stem

Creedmoor

 Granville Early College High School
 South Granville High School

Oxford

 Center for Innovative Learning
 J.F. Webb High School

Greene County

Snow Hill

 Greene Central High School
 Greene Early College High School

Guilford County

 Eastern Guilford High School, Gibsonville
 Northeast Guilford High School, McLeansville
 Oak Ridge Military Academy, Oak Ridge

High Point

 Academy at Central
 High Point Central High School
 High Point Christian Academy (Private)
 Middle College at GTCC - High Point
 Southwest Guilford High School
 T. Wingate Andrews High School
 Wesleyan Christian Academy (Private)
 Westchester Country Day School (Private)

Greensboro

Public

 Academy at Smith High School
 Ben L. Smith High School
 The Early College at Guilford
 Greensboro College Middle College
 Grimsley High School
 James B. Dudley High School
 Middle College at GTCC - Greensboro
 Middle College at NC A&T
 Northern Guilford High School
 Northwest Guilford High School
 Penn-Griffin School for the Arts
 Philip J. Weaver Academy
 Southeast Guilford High School
 Southern Guilford High School
 Walter Hines Page Senior High School
 Western Guilford High School

Private

 American Hebrew Academy
 B'nai Shalom Day School
 Caldwell Academy
 Greensboro Day School
 New Garden Friends School
 Noble Academy
 Vandalia Christian School

Jamestown

 Middle College at GTCC - Jamestown
 Ragsdale High School

Halifax County

 Northwest Collegiate and Technical Academy, Littleton
 Southeast Collegiate Prep Academy, Halifax
 Weldon High School, Weldon

Roanoke Rapids

 Roanoke Rapids High School
 Halifax Academy (Private)

Harnett County

 Harnett Central High School, Angier
 Overhills High School, Spring Lake
 Western Harnett High School, Lillington

Erwin

 Cape Fear Christian Academy (Private)
 Triton High School

Haywood County

 Pisgah High School, Canton
 Tuscola High School, Waynesville

Clyde

 Central Haywood High School
 Haywood Early College High School

Henderson County

 East Henderson High School, East Flat Rock
 Henderson County Early College High School, Flat Rock

Hendersonville

 Hendersonville High School
 Heritage Hall International School (Private)
 North Henderson High School
 West Henderson High School

Fletcher

 Fletcher Academy (Private)
 Veritas Christian Academy (Private)

Hertford County
 C. S. Brown High School S.T.E.M., Winton

Ahoskie

 Ahoskie Christian School (Private)
 Hertford County Early College High School
 Hertford County High School
 Ridgecroft School (Private)

Hoke County

Raeford

 Hoke County High School
 SandHoke Early College
 Turlington Alternative School

Hyde County

 Mattamuskeet High School, Swan Quarter
 Ocracoke High School, Ocracoke

Iredell County
 North Iredell High School, Olin

Mooresville

 Lake Norman High School
 Mooresville High School
 Pine Lake Preparatory School (Charter)
 Woodlawn School (Private)

Statesville

 Collaborative College for Technology and Leadership
 Pressly K-12 School
 Statesville Christian School (Private)
 Statesville High School
 West Iredell High School/Visual & Performing Arts Center

Troutman

 Career Academy & Technical School
 South Iredell High School

Jackson County
 Blue Ridge School, Cashiers

Sylva

 Jackson Community School
 Jackson County Early College
 Smoky Mountain High School

Johnston County

 Corinth Holders High School, Wendell
 North Johnston High School, Kenly
 Princeton High School, Princeton
 South Johnston High School, Four Oaks
 West Johnston High School, Benson

Clayton

 Clayton High School
 Cleveland High School
 Southside Christian School (Private)

Smithfield

 Johnston County Career and Technical Leadership Academy
 Johnston County Early College Academy
 Johnston County Middle College High School
 Smithfield-Selma High School

Jones County
 Jones Senior High School, Trenton

Lee County

Sanford

 Grace Christian School (Private)
 Lee Christian School (Private)
 Lee County High School
 Lee Early College High School
 Southern Lee High School

Lenoir County

 North Lenoir High School, La Grange
 South Lenoir High School, Deep Run

Kinston

 Arendell Parrott Academy (Private)
 Bethel Christian Academy (Private)
 Kinston High School
 Lenoir County Early College High School

Lincoln County

Denver

 East Lincoln High School
 Lincoln Charter School

Lincolnton

 Asbury Alternative School
 Lincolnton High School
 North Lincoln High School
 West Lincoln High School

Macon County

 Highlands School, Highlands
 Nantahala School, Topton
 Union Academy, Otto

Franklin

 Franklin High School
 Macon Early College High School

Madison County

 Madison Early College High School, Mars Hill
 Madison High School, Marshall

Martin County

 Riverside High School, Williamston
 South Creek High School, Robersonville
 Bear Grass Charter School, Bear Grass (Charter)

McDowell County
 McDowell High School, Marion

Mecklenburg County

 Grace Academy, Stallings (Private)
 William A. Hough High School, Cornelius

Charlotte

Public

 Ardrey Kell High School
 Chambers High School
 East Mecklenburg High School
 Garinger High School
 Harding University High School
 Hawthorne Academy of Health Sciences
 Mallard Creek High School
 Midwood High School
 Myers Park High School
 Northside Christian Academy
 Northwest School of the Arts
 Olympic High School
 Phillip O. Berry Academy of Technology
 Providence High School
 South Mecklenburg High School
 West Charlotte High School
 West Mecklenburg High School

Private schools

 British International School of Charlotte
 Charlotte Catholic High School
 Charlotte Christian School
 Charlotte Country Day School
 Charlotte Islamic Academy
 Charlotte Latin School
 Charlotte Secondary School (Charter)
 Charlotte United Christian Academy
 Hickory Grove Christian School
 Providence Day School
 Trinity Christian Preparatory School
 Victory Christian Center School
 United Faith Christian Academy

Davidson

 Community School of Davidson High School (Charter)
 Davidson Day School (Private)

Huntersville

 Christ the King Catholic High School (Private)
 Hopewell High School
 Lake Norman Charter School (Charter)
 North Mecklenburg High School
 Southlake Christian Academy (Private)

Matthews

 Carmel Christian School (Private)
 Covenant Day School (Private)
 David W. Butler High School
 Greyfriars Classical Academy (Private)

Mint Hill

 Independence High School
 Queen's Grant High School (Charter)
 Rocky River High School

Mitchell County
 Mitchell High School, Bakersville

Montgomery County
 Montgomery Central High School, Troy

Moore County

 North Moore High School, Robbins
 The Community Learning Center at Pinckney, Carthage
 Union Pines High School, Cameron

Southern Pines

 Pinecrest High School
 The O'Neal School (Private)

Nash County

 Southern Nash High School, Bailey
 W. L. Greene Alternative School, Nashville

Rocky Mount

 Faith Christian School (Private)
 Nash Central High School
 Nash Rocky Mount Early College
 Northern Nash High School
 Rocky Mount Academy (Private)
 Rocky Mount High School
 Rocky Mount Prep (Private)

New Hanover County

Wilmington

 Cape Fear Academy (Private)
 Coastal Christian High School (Private)
 Emsley A. Laney High School
 Eugene Ashley High School
 Isaac Bear Early College High School
 John T. Hoggard High School
 Mary S. Mosley Performance Learning Center
 New Hanover High School
 South Eastern Area Technical High School
 Wilmington Christian Academy (Private)
 Wilmington Early College High School

Northampton County
 Northeast Academy, Lasker (Private)

Gaston

 KIPP Pride High School (Charter)
 Northampton County High School

Onslow County

 Dixon High School, Holly Ridge
 Lejeune High School, Camp Lejeune
 Onslow County Learning Center, Hubert
 Richlands High School, Richlands
 Swansboro High School, Swansboro

Jacksonville

 Jacksonville High School
 Northside High School
 Onslow Early College High School
 Southwest High School
 White Oak High School

Orange County
 Carrboro High School, Carrboro

Chapel Hill

 Chapel Hill High School
 East Chapel Hill High School
 Emerson Waldorf School (Private)
 Phoenix Academy High School

Hillsborough

 Cedar Ridge High School
 Orange High School

Pamlico County

 Arapahoe Charter School, Arapahoe (Charter)
 Pamlico County High School, Bayboro

Pasquotank County

Elizabeth City

 The Albemarle School (Private)
 Northeastern High School
 Pasquotank County High School

Pender County

 Heide Trask High School, Rocky Point
 Topsail High School, Hampstead

Burgaw

 Pender Early College High School
 Pender High School

Perquimans County
 Perquimans County High School, Hertford

Person County

Roxboro

 Person Early College for Innovation & Leadership
 Person High School
 Roxboro Community School (Charter)

Pitt County

 Ayden-Grifton High School, Ayden
 Farmville Central High School, Farmville
 North Pitt High School, Bethel

Greenville

 Calvary Christian Academy (Private)
 D. H. Conley High School
 Greenville Christian Academy (Private)
 Innovation Early College High School
 John Paul II Catholic High School (Private)
 Junius H. Rose High School
 The Oakwood School (Private)

Winterville

 Christ Covenant School (Private)
 Early College High School
 South Central High School

Polk County
 Polk County Early College, Columbus
 Polk County High School, Columbus

Randolph County

 Providence Grove High School, Climax
 Randleman High School, Randleman

Asheboro

 Asheboro High School
 Fayetteville Street Christian School (Private)
 Randolph Early College High School
 Southwestern Randolph High School

Ramseur

 Eastern Randolph High School
 Faith Christian School

Trinity

 Trinity High School
 Wheatmore High School

Richmond County
 Richmond Early College High School, Hamlet
 Richmond Senior High School, Rockingham

Robeson County

 Fairmont High School, Fairmont
 Purnell Swett High School, Pembroke
 Red Springs High School, Red Springs
 St. Pauls High School, Saint Pauls

Lumberton

 Lumberton High School
 Robeson County Early College High School

Rockingham County

 Dalton McMichael High School, Mayodan
 John Motley Morehead High School, Eden
 Reidsville High School, Reidsville
 Rockingham County High School, Wentworth

Rowan County

 North Rowan High School, Spencer
 Rockwell Christian School, Rockwell (Private)
 West Rowan High School, Mount Ulla

China Grove

 Jesse C. Carson High School
 South Rowan High School

Salisbury

 East Rowan High School
 Henderson Independent High School
 North Hills Christian School (Private)
 Rowan County Early College High School
 Salisbury High School

Rutherford County

 R-S Central High School, Rutherfordton
 Rutherford Early College High School (REaCH), Spindale
 Thomas Jefferson Classical Academy, Mooresboro (Private)

Forest City

 Chase High School
 East Rutherford High School

Sampson County

 Harrells Christian Academy, Harrells (Private)
 Hobbton High School, Newton Grove
 Lakewood High School, Salemburg
 Midway High School, Spivey's Corner

Clinton

 Clinton High School
 Sampson Early College High School
 Union High School

Scotland County

Laurinburg

 Laurinburg Institute (Private)
 Scotland Early College High School (SEarCH)
 Scotland High School
 Shaw Alternative Academy

Stanly County

 Gray Stone Day School, Misenheimer (Charter)
 North Stanly High School, New London
 South Stanly High School, Norwood
 West Stanly High School, Oakboro

Albemarle

 Albemarle High School
 Stanly Academy Learning Center
 Stanly Early College High School

Stokes County
 North Stokes High School, Danbury

King

 Calvary Christian School (Private)
 West Stokes High School

Walnut Cove

 Stokes Early College
 South Stokes High School

Surry County

 East Surry High School, Pilot Mountain
 Elkin High School, Elkin

Dobson

 Surry Central High School
 Surry Early College High School of Design

Mount Airy

 Mount Airy High School
 North Surry High School
 White Plains Christian School (Private)

Swain County
 Cherokee High School, Cherokee
 Swain County High School, Bryson City

Transylvania County
 Rosman High School, Rosman

Brevard

 Brevard High School
 Davidson River Alternative School

Tyrrell County
 Columbia High School, Columbia

Union County

 Forest Hills High School, Marshville
 Weddington High School, Weddington

Indian Trail

 Metrolina Christian Academy (Private)
 Porter Ridge High School

Monroe

 Central Academy of Technology and Arts
 Monroe High School
 Piedmont High School
 Parkwood High School
 Sun Valley High School
 Tabernacle Christian School (Private)
 Union Academy (Charter)
 Union County Early College

Waxhaw

 Arborbrook Christian Academy (Private)
 Cuthbertson High School
 Marvin Ridge High School

Vance County

Henderson

 AdVance Alternative Academy
 Crossroads Christian School (Private)
 Vance County Early College High School
 Vance County High School

Wake County

 East Wake High School, Wendell
 Knightdale High School, Knightdale
 Rolesville High School, Rolesville

Apex

 Apex High School
 Apex Friendship High School
 Thales Academy (Private)

Cary

 Cary Academy (Private)
 Cary Christian School (Private)
 Cary High School
 Green Hope High School
 Green Level High School
 Hopewell Academy (Private)
 Middle Creek High School
 Panther Creek High School

Fuquay-Varina

 Fuquay-Varina High School
 Hilltop Christian School (Private)
 Willow Spring High School

Garner

 Garner Magnet High School
 South Garner High School

Holly Springs

 Holly Springs High School
 Southern Wake Academy (Private)

Raleigh

Public

 Athens Drive High School
 Leesville Road High School
 Longleaf School of the Arts
 Mary E. Phillips High School
 Millbrook High School
 Needham B. Broughton High School
 Raleigh Charter High School
 Sanderson High School
 Southeast Raleigh Magnet High School
 Vernon Malone College and Career Academy
 Wake Early College of Health and Sciences
 Wake Early College of Information and Biotechnologies
 Wake Young Men's Leadership Academy
 Wake Young Women's Leadership Academy
 Wakefield High School
 William G. Enloe High School

Private

 Cardinal Gibbons High School
 Friendship Christian School
 Grace Christian School
 Neuse Christian Academy
 North Raleigh Christian Academy
 Raleigh Christian Academy
 Ravenscroft School
 Saint Mary's School
 St. David's School
 St. Thomas More Academy
 Trinity Academy of Raleigh
 Wake Christian Academy
 Word of God Christian Academy

Wake Forest

 Franklin Academy (Charter)
 Heritage High School
 North Wake College and Career Academy
 Wake Forest High School

Zebulon

 East Wake Academy (Private)
 Heritage Christian Academy (Private)

Warren County

 Haliwa-Saponi Tribal School, Hollister
 Warren New Tech High School, Norlina

Warrenton

 Warren County High School
 Warren Early College High School

Washington County

 Washington County Early College High School, Roper
 Washington County High School, Plymouth

Watauga County
 Watauga High School, Boone

Wayne County

 Southern Wayne High School, Dudley
 Spring Creek High School, Seven Springs

Goldsboro

Public Schools

 Charles B. Aycock High School
 Eastern Wayne High School
 Goldsboro High School
 Rosewood High School
 Wayne Early/Middle College High School
 Wayne Middle/High Academy
 Wayne School of Engineering

Private Schools

 Faith Christian Academy
 Pathway Christian Academy
 St. Mary Catholic School
 Wayne Christian School
 Wayne Country Day School
 Wayne Preparatory Academy

Wilkes County

 East Wilkes High School, Ronda
 North Wilkes High School, Hays

Millers Creek

 Millers Creek Christian School (Private)
 West Wilkes High School

Wilkesboro

 Wilkes Central High School
 Wilkes Early College High School

Wilson County

Wilson

 Beddingfield High School
 Community Christian School (Private)
 Greenfield School (Private)
 James B. Hunt, Jr. High School
 Ralph L. Fike High School
 Wilson Academy of Applied Technology
 Wilson Christian Academy (Private)
 Wilson Early College Academy
 Wilson Preparatory Academy

Yadkin County

 Forbush High School, East Bend
 Starmount High School, Boonville
 Yadkin Early College High School, Yadkinville

Yancey County
 Mountain Heritage High School, Burnsville

See also
 List of school districts in North Carolina

References

 North Carolina School Report Cards
 Private School Review
 North Carolina Office of Charter Schools

North Carolina
High